Ophiem is an unincorporated community in Lynn Township, Henry County, Illinois, United States.

It was founded in 1850 by Johannes and Carl Johan Samuelson, who named it "Opphem", after their family farm in Sweden.

A post office was established in 1871.

Demographics

References

Unincorporated communities in Illinois
Unincorporated communities in Henry County, Illinois